Bouvet can have the following meanings:

Places
Bouvet Island, an uninhabited Norwegian island in the South Atlantic

People
Joachim Bouvet (1656–1730), French Jesuit who worked in China, leading member of the Figurist movement
Jean-Baptiste Charles Bouvet de Lozier (1705–1786), French explorer, discovered Bouvet Island
René Joseph Bouvet de Précourt (1715 — 1782), French Navy officer, captain of Ajax in Suffren's squadron during the War of American Independence
Pierre-Servan-René Bouvet (1750 — 1795), French Navy officer, officer in Suffren's squadron during the War of American Independence
François Joseph Bouvet de Précourt (1753–1832), French admiral
Pierre François Étienne Bouvet de Maisonneuve (1775–1860), French Navy officer
Gustave Bouvet (born 1898), French anarchist and attempted assassin
Maximilien-Nicolas Bouvet, French opera singer (1854–1943)

Organizations
Bouvet ASA, Norwegian software services company

Warships
 French ship Bouvet, five ships named in honour of François Joseph Bouvet